Heart of Worcestershire College is an academic institution with campuses at Worcester, Malvern, Redditch and Bromsgrove. It was established in August 2014 on the merging of Worcester College of Technology and North East Worcestershire College (commonly abbreviated to NEW College).

History

North East Worcestershire College 

North East Worcestershire College (NEW College) was founded in 1988 from the merger of North Worcestershire College and Redditch College of Further Education.
 
It had campuses at Redditch and Bromsgrove which also offered outreach courses in  community and employer premises across Worcestershire. Enrolment was open to anyone aged 16 and over and during the year 2009 -2010 there were around 3000 full-time and 6000 part-time students enrolled at the college.  In addition to full and part-time courses, the college offered apprenticeship training in subjects that included Accounting, Business Administration, Child-Care, Construction Trades, Engineering, Hairdressing, Health and Social Care and Motor Vehicle Engineering.

In an Ofsted inspection in 2010 inspectors assessed the college's overall performance as "good, with outstanding features" describing the college as "a lively, modern, safe and friendly place to study".  Over a ten-year period investments totalling £40m were made in upgrading existing buildings and substantial new build projects in both Redditch and Bromsgrove.  The college was noted for its development of innovative projects with private and public sector partners including Artrix the Bromsgrove Arts Centre and a Harley-Davidson European Training Centre that provided training for Harley-Davidson technicians from the UK, Europe and the Middle East. The college was designated as an LSIS 'Beacon' college.

In 2011, NEW College opened a £3.5m extension which included a new TV studio, Music Centre and Games/Interactive Media studio.

In November 2012, the Foundation Degree Media Moving Image students, created an animated music video featuring the song "All the Broken Toys at Christmas" and toys such as Action Man, Barbie and Scalextric,  to raise money for Sense for the Christmas period. At the world premiere of the music video, held at the college on 28 November, two days before its official release, Virginia Von Malachowski, a manager from Sense was present and praised the project.

Worcester College of Technology (aka Worcester College or Worcester Tech) 

The college had its origin in a School of Design which was opened in Pierpoint Street, Worcester, in 1851. In 1894, a School of Science and Art was built in Sansome Walk as part of the Victoria Institute and this served as the headquarters of the college until 1962 when the new buildings in Deansway were occupied. In 1991, the college adopted its current name of Worcester College of Technology.

The college also had two main sites including its Art and Design and Sports departments (including beauty courses) on Barbourne Road, about a mile from the City Centre, and at other locations in the city.

In 1939 the annual College enrolment was around 600 students, most of whom attended evening classes. This had risen to 15,000 enrolled students in 2006, including 3,000 full-time students. Around 1,000 of the students were studying for Higher Education Qualifications.
The college included a Sixth Form Centre, offering A-Levels and other qualifications. No state schools in Worcester had sixth forms, and so it was one of only two Sixth Form Centres in the city.

In 2014 the college received "Good" in their Ofsted inspection, which was a clear improvement from their previous grade of "Satisfactory". The inspection report stated the following: "Students develop very good personal, social and employability skills through clearly developed study programmes, particularly for those aged 16 to 18 year olds, which include a qualification in job search and interview skills. Carefully planned work experience, in real work environments, accurately matches students courses and to their future aspirations."

Barbourne College 
It originally opened in 1929 as the third site of the Worcester Secondary School for Girls. In September 1945, it became the City of Worcester Grammar School for Girls and in 1962 it was moved across the city to the site of the current Worcester Sixth Form College. It merged with the School of Science and Art and became an Art and Design College up to 1991 when the college adopted its name to Worcester College of Technology, and the Barbourne College became the Art, Design and Sports department. It ran many courses including Media Production, Graphic Design, Photography, Make-up and Hair and Beauty. It stayed that way until it closed in 2014 and the college was moved to the old Russell and Dorrell building in the city centre as the college changed its name to the Heart of Worcestershire College after it merged with North East Worcestershire College in August 2014. Much of the Barbourne building has been knocked down and turned into an apartment building for old people. The front of the building still has not changed since its opening.

Heart of Worcestershire College 
On 1 August 2014, North East Worcestershire College (NEW College) and Worcester College of Technology formally amalgamated.  The decision, was agreed by both corporations, and the name was approved by the appointed Skills Minister, Nicholas Boles.

Name of the college
The first name proposed for the merged college was Worcestershire College, but this was rejected by the then Skills Minister, Matt Hancock. During the consultation phase of the merger Sir Peter Luff, the MP for Mid-Worcestershire, complained that Worcestershire College made it sound like it was the only college in the county and that this would be unfair to South Worcestershire College and Warwickshire College, who both have campuses in Worcestershire.

Campuses

Bromsgrove

The Bromsgrove campus is situated at Slideslow Drive, next door to the Artrix, which is a multi purpose arts centre that provides theatre and cinema screening.

Malvern Campus
The college's "Construction Centre of Excellence" opened in 2006 at Spring Lane in Malvern. The centre teaches construction trades, brickwork and painting and decorating.

Redditch
The main campus is the Redditch campus situated at Peakman Street, while also the town situates Osprey House located at Albert Street and Alliance House, located on Fishing Line Road

Worcester
There are several buildings for the college in the city of Worcester. One is the All Saints' Building, located on Deansway. Following a £298,000 investment from the Worcestershire Local Enterprise Partnership, the college has refurbished and developed its Special Education Needs (SEN) facilities, The Base.

The Base facilities include a sensory room, a mocked up ‘flat’ to be used to support learners to develop independence skills, refurbished classroom areas and improved access to online facilities which support independent learning, in preparation for employment or living independently.

Its St Andrew's Building has been transformed into a modern, state-of-the-art campus with a Virtual Reality Studio, equipped with both virtual (VR) and augmented (AR) reality headsets and a Data Centre, supported by the organisation's partner Simply Hosting and Worcestershire Local Enterprise Partnership.

Moreover, the building is also home to its Spires Theatre equipped with computerised lighting system, sound systems and multiple stages and seating positions, predominantly used by its performing arts and music students.

Its St Dunstan's Building is dedicated to its creative arts and hair and beauty provision. Short-listed for the prestigious AJ Retrofit Awards, this modern building has a commercial salon, Fountains, art and design studios and coffee shop.

In 2017, the college teamed up with Freedom Leisure and Worcester City Council to develop brand new sports facilities exclusively for its students at Perdiswell Leisure Club. Facilities include: fitness studios, football pitch and bespoke teaching classrooms.

The Duckworth Centre of Engineering, is home to the college's automotive workshops, following a move from the Northbrook Automotive Centre in 2019, and offers students the opportunity to enhance their studies by applying classroom based learning in a practical environment. Working on real vehicles in the workshop, students can build on their knowledge of key vehicle systems, identify and rectify faults, conduct diagnostic checks and learn how to remove and repair engines.

As well as its facilities at The Duckworth Centre of Engineering, on Midland Road, Worcester, the college also has engineering facilities at its Cathedral Building. Located on Deansway, the building is furnished with workshops and industry standard equipment and hosts its electrical installation and manufacturing courses.

Notable former students and staff
Benjamin Williams Leader (1831-1923), landscape painter - studied at Worcester College of Design
 Thomas Brock (1847-1922), sculptor - studied at Worcester College of Design
 Michael John Foster (born 1963), politician - lecturer in accountancy and finance at Worcester College of Technology

References

External links
Heart of Worcestershire website

Further education colleges in Worcestershire
Education in Worcestershire
Bromsgrove
Malvern, Worcestershire
Redditch
Worcester, England
Learning and Skills Beacons
Schools in Malvern, Worcestershire